John Loeb may refer to:
 John Langeloth Loeb Jr., American businessman and ambassador
 John Langeloth Loeb Sr., American investor and executive
 John Jacob Loeb,  American composer

See also
 John Loebs, member of the Wisconsin State Assembly